Krishna Marandi is an Indian politician. He was a Member of Parliament, representing Singhbhum, Bihar in the Lok Sabha the lower house of India's Parliament as a member of the Jharkhand Party

References

External links
Official biographical sketch in Parliament of India website

Lok Sabha members from Bihar
Jharkhand Mukti Morcha politicians
India MPs 1991–1996
1954 births
Living people
People from Jamshedpur